James Adam (born 22 April 1931) is a Scottish former professional footballer who played in the Football League for Mansfield Town.

References

1931 births
Living people
Footballers from Paisley, Renfrewshire
Association football inside forwards
English Football League players
Leeds United F.C. players
Mansfield Town F.C. players
Airdrieonians F.C. (1878) players
Scottish footballers